Uttar Bar (also spelled Uttar Barh) is  a  village in the Daspur II CD block in the Ghatal subdivision of the Paschim Medinipur district in the state of West Bengal, India.

Geography

Location

Google maps show the location of Khaputeswari temple a little away at Faridpur.

Area overview
Ishwar Chandra Vidyasagar, scholar, social reformer and a key figure of the Bengal Renaissance, was born at Birsingha on 26 September 1820.

Ghatal subdivision, shown in the map alongside, has alluvial soils. Around 85% of the total cultivated area is cropped more than once.

Note: The map alongside presents some of the notable locations in the subdivision. All places marked in the map are linked in the larger full screen map.

Demographics
According to the 2011 Census of India, Uttar Bar had a total population of 5,675, of which 2,880 (51%) were males and 2,795 (49%) were females. There were 630 persons in the age range of 0–6 years. The total number of literate persons in Uttar Bar was 4,392 (87.06% of the population over 6 years).

Education
Kheput High School is a Bengali-medium coeducational institution established in 1860. It has facilities for teaching from class V to class XII. It has a library with 2,600 books, 16 computers and a playground.

Uttar Bar picture gallery

References

External links

Villages in Paschim Medinipur district